The 2019 Atlantic Championship Series season was the sixth season of the revived Atlantic Championship. The series was organized by Formula Race Promotions and sanctioning returned to SCCA Pro Racing after two years with USAC. Dario Cangialosi won the short four round, 8 race, championship by 82 points over Keith Grant. Cangialosi won three races to Grant's four. Flinn Lazier won a single race.

Race calendar and results

References

Atlantic Championship
Atlantic Championship seasons